Divided Loyalties is a BBC Books original novel written by Gary Russell and based on the long-running British science fiction television series Doctor Who. It features the Fifth Doctor, Tegan Jovanka, Nyssa, Adric and the Celestial Toymaker.

The book is divided into four rounds, each named after the title of an Orchestral Manoeuvres in the Dark song, as well as all the chapters within each round.

Premise
The Doctor dreams about a familiar voice calling to him for help, and awakens to find that the TARDIS has materialized aboard an Earth space station orbiting the planet Dymok. The Dymova have cut themselves off from the rest of the galaxy, and refuse to communicate with anyone beyond their planet apart from a repeated signal warning others away; however, an Observer on Dymok's surface detects the arrival of the TARDIS, and knows that salvation is at hand.

External links

1999 British novels
1999 science fiction novels
Past Doctor Adventures
Fifth Doctor novels
Novels by Gary Russell
Novels set on fictional planets